Tiwa Jatiya Aikya Manch (TJAM) is a regional political party in Assam, India.

Political parties in Assam
Political parties with year of establishment missing